Pigmented purpuric dermatosis refers to one of the three major classes of skin conditions characterized by purpuric skin eruptions.

Pigmented purpuric dermatosis are distinguished from other purpura by size (0.3–1 cm) and are most often seen in the lower extremities.  Pigmentary purpuric eruptions may present with one of several clinical patterns.  There may be overlapping characteristics among pigmented purpuric dermatosis and between their signs and those of other purpuric eruptions.  Examples of the pigmented purpuric dermatosis group include:

 Schamberg's disease
 Majocchi's disease (Purpura annularis telangiectodes)
 Gougerot-Blum syndrome (Pigmented purpuric lichenoid dermatitis)
 Ducas and Kapetanakis pigmented purpura
 Lichen aureus

Although vascular damage may be present, it is insufficient for these conditions to be considered forms of vasculitis.

A few very small non-blinded studies of treatment with narrow-band ultraviolet light have been reported as promising.

See also 
 Purpura
 Skin lesion
 List of cutaneous conditions

References

External links 

Vascular-related cutaneous conditions